Carl Remus Stimson (July 18, 1894 – November 9, 1936) was a relief pitcher in Major League Baseball who played briefly for the Boston Red Sox during the  season. He was born in Hamburg, Iowa.

Stimson posted a 22.50 earned run average in two relief appearances, including one strikeout, five walks, 12 hits allowed and 4.0 innings of work, without a decision or saves.

Stimson died at the age of 42 in Omaha, Nebraska.

External links

Retrosheet

1894 births
1936 deaths
Major League Baseball pitchers
Boston Red Sox players
Baseball players from Iowa